George Gauthier may refer to:
 George Gauthier (American football) (1890–1964), athlete at Michigan State University, coach at Michigan State and Ohio Wesleyan University
 Georges Gauthier (1871–1940), French Canadian Archbishop of Montreal and the first rector of the Université de Montréal
 George E. Gauthier (1911–1983), Canadian civil servant